Pieter Cornelius Tobias Snellen (30 August 1832 – 29 March 1911) was a Dutch entomologist.

Pieter Snellen was a merchant in Rotterdam. He is not to be confused with Samuel Constantinus Snellen van Vollenhoven, another entomologist from Rotterdam.

Works
Lepidoptera / door P.C.T. Snellen met eene inleidung door Joh. F. Snelleman. Leiden, Brill,1892 online at BHL
The Rhopalocera of Java. with Murinus Cornelius Piepers and Hans Fruhstorfer. The Hague,M. Nijhoff 1909-18. online at Biodiversity Heritage Library Four volumes.
Snellen, P.C.T. 1872 Bijdrage tot de Vlinder-Faune van Neder-Guinea, zuidwestelijk gedeelte van Afrika. Tidschrift voor Entomologie 15:1-112.   
Snellen, P.C.T. 1882 Aanteekeningen over Afrikaanische Lepidoptera. Tidschrift voor Entomologie 25:215-234.

References
Anonym. 1911 [Snellen, P. C. T.]  Entomologist's Monthly Magazine (3), London 114

External links
Gaedicke in Groll, E. K. (Hrsg.): Biografien der Entomologen der Welt : Datenbank. Version 4.15 : Senckenberg Deutsches Entomologisches Institut, 2010.

Dutch lepidopterists
1832 births
1911 deaths
Scientists from Rotterdam